, born in Toyama in 1967, is a Japanese photographer.

Hara graduated from Keio University in 1990 with a degree in literature, and then studied at the Tokyo College of Photography until 1996.

Using a medium-format camera, Hara takes photographs of people she encounters outside, in the train, and so forth. She said "My shooting style is so-called snapshot, so I can say all of my photographs were taken by a mere accident, . . . They are the photographs of somewhere yet nowhere."

Comparing her photography with that of Rinko Kawauchi, Ferdinand Brueggeman writes

Mikiko Hara's photography is poetic as well, but she has a different topic. She talks about distance and isolation of people in public spaces – especially of women.

Exhibitions

Solo exhibitions
 Is as It. Gallery le Deco (Shibuya, Tokyo), 1996.
 Agnus Dei. Ginza Nikon Salon (Ginza, Tokyo), 1998.
 Utsuro no seihō. Shinjuku Konica Plaza (Shinjuku, Tokyo), 2001. The Third Gallery Aya (Osaka), 2001.
 Hatsugo no shūen. Guardian Garden (Ginza, Tokyo), July 2004.
 Hysteric Thirteen publication exhibition. Place M (Shinjuku, Tokyo), August–September 2005.
 Humoresque. Appel (Kyōdō, Tokyo), 2006.
 Blind Letter. Cohen Amador Gallery (New York), 2007.
 Kumoma no atosaki. Gallery Tosei (Nakano, Tokyo), May 2008.
 Blind Letter. Third District Gallery (Shinjuku, Tokyo), June 2010.
In the Blink of an Eye 1996-2009. Miyako Yoshinaga Gallery (New York), September-November 2017. 
Kyrie Miyako Yoshinaga Gallery, September - October 2019

Other exhibitions
 Puraibētorūmu 2: Shin sekai no shashin hyōgen = Private Room II: Photographs by a New Generation of Women in Japan. Contemporary Art Center, Art Tower Mito (Mito, Ibaraki), April–June 1999.
 Japan: Keramik und Fotografie: Tradition und Gegenwart. Deichtorhallen (Hamburg), January–May 2003.
 Pingyao International Photography Festival (Pingyao, China), 2004.
 Nichijō kara no tabi. Shinjuku Epsite (Shinjuku, Tokyo), November–December 2005. 
 Absolutely Private: Contemporary Photography, vol 4 = . Tokyo Metropolitan Museum of Photography (Ebisu, Tokyo), March–April 2006.
 A Private History. Fotografisk Center (Copenhagen), September 2007 – January 2008.
Sangyō toshi Kawasaki no ayumi 100-nen. Kawasaki City Museum (Kawasaki), 2007.
 Shashin no genzai, kako, mirai: Shōwa kara kyō made. Yokohama Civic Art Gallery (Yokohama), December 2009.
Shibui: Six Japanese Photographers 1920s–2000. Stephen Cohen Gallery (Los Angeles), April–June 2009.
In Focus: Tokyo. J. Paul Getty Museum (Los Angeles, California), August–December 2014.

Collections
The Art Institute of Chicago, Chicago, IL
Bibliothèque nationale de France (Paris)
 Getty Museum

Books
 Hysteric Thirteen. Tokyo: Hysteric Glamour, 2005.
 These Are Days. Tokyo: Osiris, 2014. .
 Change. New York: Gould Collection, 2016. . With a short story by Stephen Dixon, "Change." Edition of 500 copies plus 26 copies with a print.

Notes

References

External links
 Mikiko Hara's Zeiss Super Ikonta 531
 Maria Lokke, "Mikiko Hara’s Hysterical Thirteen", New Yorker photo booth, 27 May 2011.

Japanese photographers
1967 births
Living people
Keio University alumni
People from Toyama Prefecture
Japanese women photographers